MotorMouf a.k.a. Khia Shamone is the fourth studio album by American hip hop artist Khia and was released digitally on July 12, 2012 on her own label ThugMisses Entertainment.

Background 
Speaking to hip hop website HipHopDX in 2010 Khia stated that the album would consist of two halves, the first containing hip hop which she has been known for until now and the second half branching out into R&B, something she had not done much up until that point. Khia released 5 singles from the album: "Been a Bad Girl", "So Addicted", "Spend It on Me", "Fix Ya Face"—a diss directed at rapper Lil' Kim—and "Pussy Bill", which was released on January 12, 2012. In 2010 Khia appeared on ABC News Now discussing the album, her "Been a Bad Girl" single and her relationship with former collaborator Janet Jackson as well as showing a clip of the "Been a Bad Girl" video which was filmed in New York and directed by Clifton Bell. In January 2013, Khia announced on her Twitter account that a video for her latest single "Turn U Out" would be filmed in mid-February, but the project has since been scrapped with the rapper beginning promotion for her fifth album Love Locs.

Track listing

Release history

References 

2012 albums
Khia albums